David Shaffer F.R.C.P., F.R.C.Psych., (born 20 April 1936) is the Irving Philips Professor of Child Psychiatry in the Departments of Psychiatry and Pediatrics, at Columbia University's College of Physicians and Surgeons in New York City, now the Columbia University Vagelos College of Physicians and Surgeons. Dr. Shaffer has also been the chief of pediatric psychiatry at New York–Presbyterian Hospital and chief of the Division of Child and Adolescent Psychiatry, New York State Psychiatric Institute. He is the former spouse of renowned  British-American journalist Anna Wintour.

Training 

Shaffer obtained his medical training in London, England. He qualified as a physician at University College London, undertook his training in paediatrics at Great Ormond Street Hospital for children in London, and trained at the Maudsley Hospital.

Study of suicide 

At the Maudsley, Shaffer conducted the first epidemiological study of child and early adolescent suicide using the psychological autopsy method. He found that there was a short delay between experiencing a stressor and the act of suicide, youth tended to show elevated levels of aggressive behavior prior to committing suicide, and imitation appeared to play a role in youth suicide. These findings would later be confirmed in his much larger controlled study in New York City and the surrounding area. Other important findings from the New York study included the very high prevalence of alcohol and substance abuse in older male teens who committed suicide and the occurrence of a prior suicide attempt as a predictor of suicide in males, but not females. In females, major depression was especially important predictor of suicide.

The finding of specific profiles and the almost universal presence of treatable psychiatric disorders among suicide victims suggested that case-finding would be a viable method for preventing suicide. However, one approach to case-finding, suicide-awareness educational programs, was found to offer few benefits and potentially increased risk. This stimulated the development of a screening strategy instead. Ultimately, Shaffer led a team of colleagues in creating the Columbia TeenScreen. The scoring algorithm had a sensitivity of 0.75, specificity 0.83, and positive predictive value 16% with suicidal ideation as the criterion.

Study of diagnosis 

Other research interests have included the development of diagnostic instruments. He was charged by the National Institutes of Health (NIMH) to develop a child version of the Diagnostic Interview Schedule (DIS) for use in large field studies. The NIMH DISC "is a highly structured diagnostic interview, designed to assess more than 30 psychiatric disorders occurring in children and adolescents, and can be administered by "lay" interviewers after a minimal training period." Shaffer has led the development of several editions of the DISC, including the version (NIMH DISC-IV), which is based closely on DSM-IV. DISC-IV includes a computerized version of the interview that incorporates voice technology. This has greatly reduced the cost of administration, and allowed for self-completion by youth unable to read, obviating the constraining presence of an adult interviewer. The DISC has been translated into nine languages and has been used in approximately two hundred child research projects. Elements of the DISC have been employed by large, multi-site studies, such as the Multimodal Treatment Study of Children with ADHD; federally administered regular surveys, such as National Health and Nutrition Examination Survey; and a number of other longitudinal studies. The availability of the instrument has, for the first time, allowed careful examination of patterns of psychiatric comorbidity and how this emerges over time, a matter of great importance for the DSM. The American Psychiatric Association funded a grant to Shaffer's group to reexamine DISC data on twenty-six thousand subjects for the purpose of identifying critical questions for DSM-V.

Shaffer's contribution to psychiatric classification dates back to 1966, when he collaborated with Sir Michael Rutter to explore the benefits of a multi-axial system for the ICD-9. The multi-axial modifications of the ICD-9 subsequently influenced the development of the DSM-III. He served on the Child and Adolescent Work Group for DSM-III and DSM-IIIR and was co-chair of that group for DSM-IV. He is currently a member of the Child and Adolescent Work Group and the Mood Disorders Work Group for DSM-V and is co-chair of the Disruptive Behaviors Disorder Workgroup for DSM-V.

Other research 

Building on data collected as part of the Columbia Presbyterian Hospital chapter of the multi-center Collaborative Perinatal Project, Shaffer led a study of the sequelae of age-7 neurological soft signs. In that study, Shaffer and his colleagues found that neurological soft signs diagnosed at age 7 were related to mood and anxiety disorders ten years later.

Later years 

Shaffer retired as director of the Division of Child and Adolescent Psychiatry at the New York State Psychiatric Institute (NYSPI)/Columbia University (CU) in May 2008, but retains his academic position and is actively engaged in research on DSM-5, the determinants and triggers of suicidal ideation, and the categorization of suicidal ideation and behavior in adolescents.

He has served as a consultant on suicide prevention for the U.S. Department of Defense, the Indian Health Service, and the New York State Office of Mental Health. He was a member of the Surgeon General’s Advisory Task Force on Suicide Prevention. He is a past president of the American Foundation for Suicide Prevention and of the Society for Research in Child and Adolescent Psychopathology.

Awards and honours 

 The American Psychiatric Association awarded him the McGavin Award in 1995 and the Itteleson award in 2000.
 In 2007, he received lifetime achievement awards from NARSAD and from the American Foundation for Suicide Prevention.
 He received the American Suicide Foundation's award for research in suicide in 1989 and the American Mental Health Fund Research Award for research on suicide in 1990.
 The American Academy of Child and Adolescent Psychiatry awarded him the Philips Prize for outstanding contribution to prevention in 1998, the Klingenstein Third-Generation Foundation Award for Research in Depression or Suicide in 2004, and the Catcher in the Rye Award in 2006.
 In 2009, he received the Joseph Zubin Award from the American Psychopathological Association.

Offices held 

 President of the International Society for Research in Child and Adolescent Psychiatry
 President of the American Foundation for Suicide Prevention
 President elect of the International Society for Research in Suicide Prevention.
 Chairman of the Work Group on Research for the American Academy of Child and Adolescent Psychiatry.

In addition to these research studies, he has contributed to the debate about the relationship between SSRI antidepressants and suicidal behavior for the American Academy of Child and Adolescent Psychiatry, the American Psychiatric Association, and both the American College of Neuropsychopharmacology and the European College of Neuropsychopharmacology.

Family life 

He has been married and divorced twice. His first wife was the caterer Serena Bass, by whom he has two sons. His second wife, by whom he has a daughter and a son, was Vogue editor-in-chief Anna Wintour.

References 

 Shaffer D, Gould MS, Brasic J, Ambrosini P, Fisher P, Bird H, Aluwahlia S.  A children's global assessment scale (CGAS). Arch Gen Psychiatry. 1983;16(11):1228-1231. PubMed .
 Shaffer D, Gould MS, Brasic J, Ambrosini P, Fisher P, Bird H, Aluwahlia S.  A children's global assessment scale (CGAS) (for children 4 to 16 years of age). Psychopharmacol Bull. 1985; 1(4):747-748.

External links

20th-century British medical doctors
21st-century British medical doctors
Alumni of University College London
Place of birth missing (living people)
Columbia University faculty
British psychiatrists
Living people
1936 births
New York State Psychiatric Institute people